Doncaster Demonstration Forest is a state park in Charles County of the state Maryland. It serves as an educational resource where a variety of silvicultural practices, forest best management practices and wildlife habitat management practices are implemented and studied. Recreational opportunities in Doncaster include hunting, hiking, horseback riding and mountain biking. It contains about 13 miles of marked trails.

Location 
Doncaster Demonstration Forest is located in Charles County, Maryland. Doncaster is located at Nanjemoy, MD 20662, USA, on the North side of Port Tobacco Road due east of Gilroy Road, and the west side of Gilroy Road, south of Gilroy Road and Port Tobacco road intersection. Doncaster is 12 miles west of La Plata off of Maryland Route 6.

References

External links

Maryland DNR Forest Service – Doncaster Demonstration Forest

Maryland state forests
Protected areas of Charles County, Maryland